There are two species of lizard named insular agama:

 Agama cristata
 Agama insularis